Charles Anthony Fager (January 16, 1924 - April 8, 2014) was born in Nassau, Bahamas, British West Indies. He had a long career as a neurosurgeon in the United States.

Education 
Fager graduated from Wagner College and SUNY Downstate Medical Center (M.D., 1946). His did both his internship (1946–47) and residency in general surgery (1947–48) at Syracuse University Medical Center. That was followed by a residency in neurosurgery at Cushing VA Hospital, Framingham, Massachusetts (1950–52), and a fellowship in neurosurgery at Lahey Clinic (1952–53).

Career 
His many publications concerned the appropriate selection of patients and the proper indications and operations for surgery. These focused on the importance of posterior and posterolateral operations for cervical disc lesions. He spoke regularly at postgraduate courses and seminars, and wrote chapters in textbooks on these subjects.

Charles Anthony Fager, MD, a pioneering neurosurgeon, died on April 8, 2014. "Dr. Fager served as president of the Neurosurgical Society of America and chaired the neurosurgery department at Lahey Hospital and Medical Center in Burlington, Mass. The hospital later named its neurosurgery endowment fund and the department chair in his honor. He was a faculty member at Harvard Medical School and authored a textbook of neurosurgery called "Atlas of Spinal Surgery," according to the report."

Accomplishments and awards 
Fager was a member of the American Medical Association; the Massachusetts Medical Society; the New England Neurosurgical Society (past-President); the Boston Society of Neurology and Psychiatry (past-President); the American Association of Neurological Surgeons(AANS) and the Congress of Neurological Surgeons{CNS}, American College of Surgeons (past-Chairman, Advisory Council for Neurosurgery; Chairman, Advisory Council Chairman); the Neurosurgical Society of America (past-President); the Boston Surgical Society; the Argentine Neurosurgical Association; and the Venezuelan Society of Neurosurgery

Fager received the Dudley Award in Medicine from New York State University Downstate Medical Center and the Lifetime achievement Award from the Joint Section on Disorders of the Spine of the AANS & CNS in 1992. He was a member of the American Board of Neurological Surgery from 1976 to 1983. He gave a number of guest lectures, the Teachenor Memorial, The Balado Memorial and the Gardner Lectures, among them. In 2000, he received the Gold Medal of the Neurological Society of America.

Fager and John A. Nerud 
In 1965, Dr. Fager saved the life of John A. Nerud, a horse trainer who had a blood clot on his brain. Profoundly thankful, Nerud named a horse after Fager, who soon became a fan of horseracing. The horse, Dr. Fager, was a record-setter, horse of the year in 1968, and the only horse to win four championships in a single year.

Notable publications 

Atlas of spinal surgery - Volume 17 (1989),
Stop talking to the jury: stories of a medical witness (2004)
Quality of the Issue: Memoirs and Perspectives of a Neurosurgeon (2001)
 A Hole in the Wind : The Story of a Man and His Horse (2004)
Analysis of failures and poor results of lumbar spine surgery (1980) 
Intrasellar epithelial cysts (1966) 
Results of adequate posterior decompression in the relief of spondylotic cervical myelopathy (1973) 
Management of Cervical Disc Lesions And Spondylosis by Posterior Approaches (1977) 
Intracranial Aneurysms Results of Surgical Treatment (1960)

References 

1924 births
2014 deaths
Harvard Medical School faculty
Bahamian neurosurgeons
Bahamian emigrants to the United States
Wagner College alumni
SUNY Downstate Medical Center alumni